Rose Hulse ( Adkins) is a British entrepreneur born in the United States and is the founder and CEO of TV streaming company, ScreenHits TV. In 2017, she married into the British aristocracy.

Early life 
Hulse grew up in Santa Monica, California. She is the daughter of Leon and Maxine Adkins and has three siblings. She was a youth classical musician and competitive figure skater. She attended University of Southern California and California State University, Northridge, where she received a B.S. in business administration.

Career
Hulse began her career in politics, working for Los Angeles Mayor Richard Riordan in international trade. She then made a career shift to publishing and media, working for companies including Weider Publications, The Hollywood Reporter, NBC Universal, and Sundance Institute before launching her own company in 2012 and ventured into media tech and powered video distribution platforms for Turner Broadcasting (Warner Media) and provided services for IMG, Disney Latin America, Sony Pictures Television, and BBC Worldwide.

ScreenHits Limited, which spawned her current passion project ScreenHits TV, as described by Glamour Magazine, is a genius app that allows subscribers to integrate all their streaming platforms from Netflix to Disney Plus in one app. ScreenHits TV was named by Forbes as one of their 'Black-Owned Businesses You Need to Know.' ScreenHits TV is listed as one of the top 100 Media Tech Innovators in the UK by Business Cloud Magazine.

In 2017, Hulse became an ambassador for jewellery brand Tiffany and Co.

Hulse's career has been featured in Tatler, Hello Magazine, Grazia, The Hollywood Reporter, BBC Radio 4 Woman's Hour, and Glamour. She is a member of the International Academy of Arts and Sciences, British Screen Forum and the DEG (Digital Entertainment Group). She is also on the committee of the Television Radio and Industries club (TRIC Awards). ScreenHits TV has raised funding from notable investors from the media and tech space and has recently been listed at the top of Variety’s Silicon Valleywood Impact Report. Hulse was recently listed in VOD Professionals top 50 as one of the most influential people working in the UK’s video-on-demand and OTT industry coming in at number 10 amongst industry leaders from Amazon Studios, Netflix and Apple.

Personal life 
Hulse has been featured in the press due to her ties with British aristocracy and her viewpoints on "Megxit". In 2017 she married George Richard Hulse, the grandson of a baronet. George Richard Hulse's grandfather was Sir Westrow Hamilton Hulse, 9th Baronet. George Hulse's family - whose seat, Breamore House, is in Hampshire. The 1st Baronet Hulse, Sir Edward Hulse, born in 1682, was physician to Queen Anne and Georges I and II. Her wedding was featured in British society magazine, Tatler and was attended by the English aristocracy. The wedding took place at St George's, Hanover Square, followed by a reception at Spencer House, which is owned by the late Diana, Princess of Wales brother, Charles. Hulse is involved with a number of charities and organisations and is currently a member of the British Screen Forum's select membership group. Hulse lives in between London and Somerset with her husband and they have two daughters.

Activism 
Hulse speaks out against racism and inequality. She tries to bring awareness of the challenges women of colour face in the tech world and when raising finance. In an article written by Glamour Magazine, Hulse states "I always got no" she says, "before I even opened up my mouth it was always a no. I had to learn really quickly how to turn those into a yes".

References 

British women in business
Living people
People from Santa Monica, California
University of Southern California alumni
1980 births
California State University, Northridge alumni